Vinjamur is an upcoming town in Nellore district of the Indian state of Andhra Pradesh. It is the mandal headquarters of Vinjamur mandal.

Near mandals 
East kaligiri mandal
West duttaluru mandal
North kondapuram mandal
South anusamudrapeta mandal

Nearby villages 
Nandigunta 5 km
Utukuru 7 km
Nagasamudram 8 km
Gottigundala of Kondapuram Mandal - 11 km
Sankavaram 11 km
Padakandla 13 km

Villages
There are 16 administrative villages in vinjamur Mandal.
bukkapuram
Chakalakonda
Chandrapadia
Chinthalapalem
Gundemadakala
Janardhanapuram
Katepalli
Kistipuram
Nallagonda
Nandigunta
Ravipadu
Sankavaram
Thamidapadu
Utukuru
Juvviguntapalem
Vannurupalem
Vinjamur

Irrigational facilities

Borewells are the main source of drinking and irrigated water. Yarraballipalem Pond and Pathur Pond are important ponds. Water supply to agriculture in vinjamur is through the following sources. 
Wells / Bore wells: 150 hectares

Ponds: 403 hectares

Demographics 

The total 
population constitute,  males,  females and 
 children, in the age group of 0–6 years. The average literacy rate stands at 
80.31% with  literates, higher than the national average of 73.00%.

References 

Villages in Nellore district